Edward Bloomberg (currently known as Red Devil) is a superhero appearing in American comic books published by DC Comics. Created by Alan Kupperberg, Dan Mishkin, and Gary Cohn, the character first appeared in Fury of Firestorm #2 (June, 1984). The character was originally codenamed Kid Devil and was the sidekick to fellow superhero, Blue Devil, and possessed similar powers through a suit. Eventually, the character would later adopt his current code and act a member of the Teen Titans shortly after being granted demonic-like powers that were the result of his metagene.

Publication history
Created by Alan Kupperberg, Dan Mishkin, and Gary Cohn, he first appeared in Blue Devil #14.

Fictional character biography

Origin and early heroics
Eddie had the good fortune of being a gofer in his Aunt Marla's film company. He met Blue Devil on a film set, and became quite a fan of the hero, dreaming about one day becoming Blue's sidekick.

Edward snuck into Blue Devil's workshop at night and, using his prodigious knowledge of electronics, created a battlesuit incorporating the designs of the Blue Devil suit. Even though Blue Devil did not want a sidekick, Eddie was determined to make a go at being a hero. As "Kid Devil", he assisted his hero in foiling an airplane hijacking, and later helped defeat one of his enemies, the Vanquisher. After these adventures, his parents left Eddie's education and supervision to professors at the Institute of Hypernormal Conflict Studies.

After Eddie's Aunt Marla died in a helicopter crash, Eddie attempted to live up to her name and succeed in the movie business. His attempts failed, however, and Eddie continued to have adventures as Kid Devil. He helps Young Justice's assault on Zandia, a small country that has become a refuge for supervillains.

Changes and Titans
Since the events in Infinite Crisis, Eddie has tried to join the Teen Titans with little success. Pulsar helps Eddie get into a project Lex Luthor has been using to give normal humans superpowers, but Eddie fails because of "psychological problems". One evening, Eddie is visited by a cloaked figure, who gives him a candle. Eddie then goes to find his friend, Zachary Zatara. Zatara, being a magician, knows a little about magic and tells Eddie that the candle is a "demon stick", forged in demon's blood. Zatara tells Eddie that if someone light it, it will take him to its creator (which could be anyone). Eddie asks if, after teleporting them both to the creator, Zatara could just teleport them back. Zatara brags that he could, even though his magic could only affect things, not people. Not knowing of Zatara's inability to teleport anyone anywhere, Eddie decides to light it and the two are taken to Neron. Neron makes a deal with Eddie, transforming him into a new Kid Devil. Neron's magic gives Eddie a new, demonic appearance and inherent superpowers. As part of the deal, Eddie will not lose his soul to Neron if he can still trust Blue Devil by his 20th birthday. Before Eddie leaves, Neron tells him that it is Blue Devil's fault that his Aunt Marla died. Zachary helps Eddie join the Teen Titans, they battle Kid Crusader, and Zachary promises to keep his secret.

One Year Later, a rift has formed between Eddie and Zachary. Though Eddie is still friendly with Zachary, the boy magician wants nothing to do with Eddie or any of the other Titans. Eddie also forges a bond with Rose Wilson, as both new members feel like third-string Titans. For many months, Eddie tells the Titans of multiple daily phone calls to Blue Devil as his way of confirming that "everything is fine".

On a Titans mission, Eddie is disemboweled by Plasmus and the EMTs are unable to help him. The new Doom Patrol arrives and take Kid Devil to their HQ for treatment, where the Chief heals Eddie while also attempting to manipulate him into joining the Doom Patrol (as he has done to the other DP members). During the operation, the Chief revealed to Elasti-Girl that Kid Devil is not truly a demon by nature, but rather his powers are the result of metahuman gene manipulation. Robin calls Blue Devil, as he is on Kid Devil's emergency contact list, but finds that the number is out of order. Robin eventually tracks down Blue Devil and tells him the situation. Blue Devil tells Robin that he has not seen or spoken to Eddie in two years. When Robin confronts Eddie about his relationship with Blue Devil, Eddie confesses he was only pretending in order to better fit in with the Titans. The Chief's manipulation is stopped by both the Titans and the other members of the Doom Patrol, which makes Eddie feel as if he is finally accepted as a Titan since they stood up for him. He also tries rekindling his bond with Blue Devil, but the man does not show up to a meeting to which Eddie invited him. Later, Eddie finally finds and confronts Blue Devil. Blue Devil admits that he was to blame for his Aunt Marla's death and that it was an accident. As part of a deal with Neron for gaining fame and fortune, Blue Devil was asked to destroy an unmanned electrical power station. Despite Blue Devil's various precautions, a resulting power surge accidentally killed Marla, who was scouting the nearby area for a film. Eddie storms off before Blue Devil can explain further, telling Blue Devil to stay far away from him. Now having lost his trust in Blue Devil, Eddie knows that he will lose his soul to Neron. Still, Eddie decides to make the best of his remaining years by having a good time with his friends. He comforts himself by saying that, at least, he has Marla's memory and that Neron cannot take that away from him. However, it is revealed that Neron is holding Marla's soul captive.

Kid Devil is attacked by Kid Crusader, who vows to "save" him from Neron by turning Eddie back into a human and killing him. Kid Crusader appears to succeed when he exorcizes the demon from Eddie and returns him to his human form, but the demon is now bound to Kid Crusader himself. When given the choice later to either return to his demonic form or stay human, Eddie chooses his demonic form, not wishing to damn anyone else (even his enemy) to his fate as Neron's protégé.

Titans Tomorrow
In Teen Titans (vol. 3) #51, the Titans Tomorrow (a possible future version of the current Titans team) arrive in the present to aid the Teen Titans against Starro-controlled villains. Now known as Red Devil, Kid Devil is shown as part of the team. He claims that even though the loss of his soul to Neron at 20 was bad, the power he receives far outweighs the consequences.

Eddie initially watches as Ravager battles alone against Rampage and Livewire, before betraying his older self in order to aid Rose. Later, Rose, Red Devil, and Eddie return to the Titan's Lair (home of the original Teen Titans), where they meet with Blue Beetle. There, Eddie learns that he is supposedly destined to murder the Blue Beetle some point in the future.

Shortly after Eddie, Rose, and Jaime find themselves surrounded by an army of Titans led by Lex Luthor before they all battle against an invading army of Starros. Thanks in large part to Blue Beetle's powers and Robin and Wonder Girl managing to supposedly alter Robin's future (and thus alter the future of the Titans as a whole), the army of Titans is defeated. Prior to his vanishing, Red Devil warns Eddie against trusting Blue Beetle.

Terror Titans
In Teen Titans (vol. 3) #56, a group of supervillains under the leadership of the new Clock King began a systematic assault on the Titans. With Wonder Girl, Blue Beetle, Ravager, and Robin away and Miss Martian still reeling from the battle with her future counterpart (whose mind is revealed to have taken refuge in Megan's), Eddie decides to throw a party in Titans Tower and invites several Titans fans. The party quickly gets out of hand when the guests trash the place, go through personal items, and prank call Batman. Lectured by all members of the team (except Miss Martian, who had left for the week to resolve her own problems), Eddie goes into town with one of the guests, who reveals himself to be Dreadbolt, the son of Bolt. A fight ensues and the arrival of the rest of the Terror Titans puts a quick end to the battle.

In the aftermath, Kid Devil finds himself chained to a wall and severely injured, captive of the Clock King, who then begins shattering his self-confidence telling him that Rose Wilson could not care less about his status, encouraging him to accept his place as a monster. Brought to the Dark Side Club as a challenger, he is imprisoned in the same cell in which Miss Martian is later brought, who finds him reduced to a rampaging, savage monster due to his physical and mental ordeal. M'Gann tries unsuccessfully to undo the damage, but Eddie is brought to face Hardrock in a death match.

Red Devil
After the crisis with the Terror Titans is settled, Kid Devil is saved, and with the help of the Teen Titans, is able to rebuild his mental sanity while he is nursed back to health.

Still trying to prove himself, he begins searching for Shockwave, who is rampaging apparently without a pattern throughout America, deliberately hiding from Robin his suspicions to avoid burdening the decimated Titans with an apparent wild goose chase.

He is forced then to accept the unwilling cooperation of Blue Beetle, who, demonstrating to be a better detective than he and a more seasoned fighter despite his later induction into heroics, goes on alone. In a fit of anger spurred by his inability to come in and fight Shockwave, he finally unlocks the full might of his demonic powers, as demonstrated by his future counterpart, teleporting effortlessly from Salt Lake City to Denver and melting off Shockwave's exoskeleton with a touch.

Kid Devil is able to resolve his jealousy issues about Ravager when he learns that Blue Beetle had no interest in her at all. He then honors his newfound maturity by taking the sobriquet of Red Devil. Jaime happily teases Eddie about his new costume, hinting that while in the Tomorrow history they were sworn enemies; at present, they have a budding friendship signified by Eddie giving Jaime the playful nickname "Bug-Butt" which Jaime reciprocates by calling him "Sizzle-Shorts".

Around this time the events of Final Crisis happen, Eddie becomes one of the last few super-powered resistance members operating out of the time-tossed Justice League Watchtower. The Miracle Machine restores everything back to normal.

Soon after Blue Beetle joins the team, Miss Martian, with whom Eddie had become increasingly closer, has opted to leave the team due in large part to her being merged with her evil future self. Still, Eddie appears to have become more content with his life amongst the Titans and has become closer to Blue Beetle and his girlfriend Traci 13. During a Christmas trip to New York, Miss Martian appeared to him to wish him a Merry Christmas and promised that she would return soon.

Soon after, the Titans began having a membership drive, with Red Devil teleporting to each potential hero so as to offer them membership. Unfortunately, none seem available or willing to join. The stress of multiple 'ports eventually causes Eddie to pass out on his return to the tower. On the night that follows, Robin opts to leave the team shortly before Brother Blood returns from Hell. During the battle against him, Blood manages to absorb the demonic power from Eddie, leaving him human again and supposedly free of Neron's debt.

Powerless
Eddie, now powerless, is offered by Kid Eternity a chance to travel to Hell and see his contract with Neron in an attempt to regain his powers. Learning that he had not signed the contract, he finds that Neron tapped into his metagene, which activated his demon-like powers. Blaze, having won the war in Hell, offers Eddie a new contract, with his demonic powers now irrevocable, but with the same price of servitude as Neron's contract. Kid Eternity intervenes and summons Eddie's Aunt Marla. Marla convinces Eddie not to take the contract. Eddie continues to be a member of the team, but his ability to help is unclear. To add insult to injury, Eddie is asked by new Titan recruit Static if he is the "team janitor" due to his lack of abilities. During the prelude to the Deathtrap crossover, Eddie dons his old mechanical costume to combat the Tower's defense mechanisms, which had been overridden by crazed former Titan Jericho.

His way of helping, which Bombshell repeatedly makes fun of, is to be the eyes and ears for the Teen Titans when the new Fearsome Five reform under the Calculator. However, he is also seen as helping the team through communications and coordinating missions at Titans Tower.

He later died saving the city from a radioactive man who was about to explode while the other Titans were putting down a prison riot. It appears that this was all part of the Calculator's plan to get revenge at the Titans for the previous death of his son Marvin and the injury of his daughter Wendy.

The New 52
In The New 52, Eddie Bloomberg first appears as the godson to Blue Devil.

Red Devil checked into Sanctuary and is among the heroes who were killed in an unexpected attack.

Powers and abilities

Originally, Eddie wore a devil suit which gave him enhanced strength and agility, near impenetrable armor, a weapons system that included a bright light burst effect, exploding bubbles, night vision, and mini-gills. He also had a rocket trident which could propel him through the air for distances of up to several miles and could emit flames and/or electric shocks.

After the events of Infinite Crisis and 52, Eddie has a demonic appearance and inherent abilities, both granted to him by the demon-lord Neron. His new form gives him a capacity to breathe fire, enhanced strength and endurance, and an ability to heal from non-fatal wounds ten times faster than a human. When punched in the stomach, Eddie cannot control his fire breath. Eddie's blood is now a thick gasoline-smelling liquid, his breath is hotter than fire, his own skin is able to cause burns (being at 200 degrees) and he has been seen to be able to increase this, to the point of his skin turning white hot. He can fire streams of flame from his hands, has retractable wings underneath his arms that help him glide, possesses a prehensile tail, and his internal temperature is 600°. He learned how to create portals of fire through which he can travel long distances.

When Dr. Niles Caulder, leader of the Doom Patrol, tended Kid Devil's injury, he revealed that the young hero is not a demon nor are his powers supernatural in nature, despite being granted by a demon. Rather, Neron activated Eddie's metahuman gene which gave him his powers, but due to his deal with Neron, his given demonic form causes his skin to burn while inside a sacred building such as a church.

Eddie lost his powers due to an attack by the new Brother Blood, Sebastian, shortly before sacrificing himself to save the other Titans.

Other versions

Chris King
Chris King is quite literally the hero of a thousand faces. He is a user of the legendary H Dial who was part of a team with Vick Grant. Each time he goes into action, he has a new and completely different identity and powers, conjured up entirely at random in a pattern that never repeats itself, in one of the missions he used the name "Red Devil". He first appears in Legion of Super-Heroes (vol. 2) #272 (February 1981) and was created by Marv Wolfman and Carmine Infantino. He has also used the names Moth, Doomster, Wrangler, Volcano, Mister Thin, Dragonfly, Zeep, Steadfast, Avatar, Power Punch, Glassman, Trouble Clef, Puffball, X-Rayder, Kinetic Kid, Jimmy Gymnastic, Trailblazer, Any- Body, Earth-Man, Spheror, Music Master, Rock, Mister Opposite, Topsy-Turvy, Centaurus, Spectro, Hasty Pudding, Prism, Electrostatic, White, Brimstone, Stuntmaster, Radar Man, Shadow Master, Deflecto, Worm Man, Air Master, Sting, Attacker, Galaxy, Enlarger-Man and Ragnarok. This Rés Dev powers are: Could turn into a variety of demons including invisible and large spikey.

Flashpoint
In the alternate universe of Flashpoint, Kid Devil is a member of the Resistance.

Final Crisis
A spacebound Blue Devil met a futuristic version of Edward who was saved from being erased from existence. Blue Devil also encountered a Nazi version of him.

Tiny Titans
Kid Devil appears in Tiny Titans as a toddler. Raven often has to babysit for him. Her father, Trigon, shows more of an interest in Kid Devil than in Raven when she does. He thinks of Kid Devil as "a cute little baby". Raven often tells Trigon that Kid Devil is not a baby, he is a little kid. Trigon does not listen and only babies Kid Devil more. Kid Devil does not speak in this series and relies solely on visual gags. In one issue, Kid Devil travels to the center of the Earth with Terra, Hotspot, and Beast Boy, and meets Etrigan.

References

Fictional characters who have made pacts with devils
DC Comics sidekicks
DC Comics characters who can teleport
DC Comics characters with accelerated healing
DC Comics characters with superhuman strength
DC Comics demons
DC Comics metahumans
DC Comics male superheroes
Comics characters introduced in 1985
Fictional characters from California
Fictional characters with fire or heat abilities